Delphine Claudel (born 23 March 1996) is a French cross-country skier. She competed in the women's 10 kilometre freestyle at the 2018 Winter Olympics. She competed at the 2022 Winter Olympics, in Women's 30 kilometre freestyle, Women's 15 kilometre skiathlon,  and Women's 4 × 5 kilometre relay.

Cross-country skiing results
All results are sourced from the International Ski Federation (FIS).

Olympic Games

World Championships

World Cup

Season standings

Individual podiums
 1 victory – (1 )
 4 podiums – (1 , 3 )

References

External links
 

1996 births
Living people
French female cross-country skiers
Olympic cross-country skiers of France
Cross-country skiers at the 2018 Winter Olympics
Cross-country skiers at the 2022 Winter Olympics
Tour de Ski skiers
Place of birth missing (living people)
People from Remiremont
Sportspeople from Vosges (department)
21st-century French women